Hector Gonzalez (born 1964) is an American lawyer who is a United States district judge of the United States District Court for the Eastern District of New York.

Education 

Gonzalez earned his Bachelor of Science from Manhattan College in 1985 and his Juris Doctor from the University of Pennsylvania Law School in 1988, where he was an editor of the University of Pennsylvania Law Review. He subsequently earned his  Master of Arts in criminal justice from City University of New York in 1995.

Legal career 

From 1990 to 1994, Gonzalez served as an Assistant District Attorney in the Manhattan District Attorney's Office, and from 1994 to 1999, Gonzalez served as an Assistant United States Attorney in the United States Attorney's Office for the Southern District of New York, where he was Chief of the Narcotics Unit. From 1999 to 2011, he was a partner at the law firm of Mayer Brown in their New York City office. 

In 2002, New York City Mayor Michael Bloomberg named Gonzalez as Chairman of the Civilian Complaint Review Board, an agency that investigates charges of police misconduct. During his time as chairman, the review board recommended increased training for police officers in order to prevent inappropriate strip searches. From 2011 to 2022, he was a partner at Dechert, LLP in New York City where he served as chair of the firm's Global Litigation Group.

In 2014, New York Governor Andrew Cuomo considered nominating Gonzalez to be a judge on the New York Court of Appeals, but nominated Eugene Fahey instead.

Federal judicial service

Expired nomination to district court under Trump 

On August 12, 2020, President Donald Trump announced his intent to nominate Gonzalez to serve as a United States district judge for the United States District Court for the Eastern District of New York as part of a bipartisan package of nominees which included Ryan McAllister. On September 8, 2020, his nomination was sent to the U.s. Senate. President Trump nominated Gonzalez to the seat vacated by Judge Brian Cogan, who assumed senior status on June 12, 2020. On January 3, 2021, his nomination was returned to the President under Rule XXXI, Paragraph 6 of the United States Senate.

Renomination to district court under Biden 

On December 15, 2021, President Joe Biden renominated Gonzalez to the same seat. On January 12, 2022, a hearing on his nomination was held before the Senate Judiciary Committee. On February 10, 2022, his nomination was reported out of committee by a 13–9 vote. On March 16, 2022, the United States Senate invoked cloture on his nomination by a 52–44 vote. On March 23, 2022, his nomination was confirmed by a 52–45 vote. He received his judicial commission on April 18, 2022.

See also 
 List of Hispanic/Latino American jurists

References

External links 
 

1964 births
Living people
21st-century American lawyers
21st-century American judges
American judges of Cuban descent
Assistant United States Attorneys
Hispanic and Latino American judges
Hispanic and Latino American lawyers
Judges of the United States District Court for the Eastern District of New York
Manhattan College alumni
New York (state) lawyers
People associated with Mayer Brown
People from Havana
United States district court judges appointed by Joe Biden
University of Pennsylvania Law School alumni